Anna Sergeevna Frolova (born 7 August 2005) is a Russian figure skater. She is the 2020 Winter Youth Olympic bronze medalist, the 2019 JGP Italy silver medalist, and the 2019 JGP Croatia bronze medalist.

Personal life 
Frolova was born on 7 August 2005 in Mytishchi, Russia.

Career

Early years 
Anna began learning how to skate in 2010 at the age of five.

2019–20 season: Junior international debut 
Despite initially not receiving any Junior Grand Prix assignments, Frolova made her international junior debut in September 2019 at the 2019 JGP Croatia, replacing an injured Alena Kanysheva. Frolova placed third in both the short program and the free skate to finish third overall behind South Korean gold medalist Lee Hae-in and fellow Russian silver medalist Daria Usacheva.

At her second assignment, the 2019 JGP Italy in October, Frolova won the silver medal behind then training mate Ksenia Sinitsyna despite falling from second to fourth in the free skate standings. With her two medals, Frolova earned a total of 24 qualifying points toward the 2019–20 Junior Grand Prix Final, tying with Viktoria Vasilieva. However, due to Vasilieva's higher combined total score across both of her Junior Grand Prix events, Frolova was named the first alternate to the event.

Frolova next competed at the 2020 Russian Figure Skating Championships. She placed 7th in the short program and later climbed to 5th in the free skate to finish 6th overall, against just behind Ksenia Sinitsyna. Frolova was accompanied to the event by CSKA Moscow coach Sergei Davydov, suggesting that she'd decided to part ways with Svetlana Panova and her team at SC Snow Leopards. Due to her result, she was initially named the first alternate to the 2020 Winter Youth Olympics but was called up after Viktoria Vasilieva suffered an injury.

At the 2020 Winter Youth Olympic Games, Frolova placed third in the short program and fourth in the free skate to win the bronze medal overall behind Young You in first place and Kseniia Sinitsyna in second. She set new personal bests in all three segments of the competition despite technical challenges in her free program. Frolova was also named to Team Future, composed of men's single skater Matteo Nalbone of Italy, Frolova, Chinese pair team Wang Yuchen / Huang Yihang, and Ukrainian ice dance team Anna Cherniavska / Oleg Muratov for the mixed-NOC team trophy. Frolova finished 2nd in the ladies event, and the team placed 7th overall.

2020–21 season 
Frolova won the silver medal at the first stage of the domestic Russian Cup in Syzran and placed fourth at the second stage in Moscow.

At the 2021 Russian Championships, Frolova placed eleventh.

Programs

Competitive highlights 
JGP: Junior Grand Prix

Detailed results 
Small medals for short and free programs awarded only at ISU Championships.

Senior results

Junior results

References

Russian female single skaters
People from Mytishchi
2005 births
Living people
Figure skaters at the 2020 Winter Youth Olympics
Sportspeople from Moscow Oblast